François Athanase de Charette de la Contrie (2 May 1763 – 29 March 1796) was a Franco-Breton Royalist soldier and politician. He served in the French Navy during the American Revolutionary War and was one of the leaders of the Revolt in the Vendée against the French Revolution. His great-nephew Athanase-Charles-Marie Charette de la Contrie was a noted military leader and great-grandson of Charles X, the penultimate king of France.

Life

Early activities
A nobleman born in Couffé, arrondissement of Ancenis, Charette served in the French Navy under Toussaint-Guillaume Picquet de la Motte, notably during the American War of Independence, and became lieutenant de vaisseau. He notably served on the 74-gun Hercule, under Puget-Bras.

Following the outbreak of the French Revolution, he quit the Navy in 1789 and emigrated to Koblenz (Trier) in 1792 (a common move for royalist aristocrats). He soon returned to France to live at his property in La Garnache, and became one of the royalist volunteers who assisted in defending King Louis XVI and Marie Antoinette from physical harm during the mob attack on Tuileries Palace (the Journée du 10 août); arrested in Angers, he was released through the intervention of Charles François Dumouriez.

Vendée War

In 1793, the Revolt in the Vendée against the French First Republic broke out, and the peasant fighters asked Charette to be their leader. He joined Jacques Cathelineau following the taking of Saumur in June 1793 and fought in most of the battles of the Catholic and Royal Army. On 19 September 1793, he participated in the victorious Battle of Tiffauges. Afterwards he and Louis Marie de Lescure had marched on Saint-Fulgent to pursue Jean-Baptiste Kléber, who had escaped. Charette won another victory over the Republicans at the First Battle of Noirmoutier. Some of the captured soldiers took part in the Machecoul Massacres and a quarter of them were executed for retribution by Charette's troops, against his orders. After the parting of the Vendean leaders in September 1793, he and his men retreated. He became the leader of the Lower Vendée, and successfully used guerrilla warfare against the Republican troops, capturing a Republican camp in Saint-Christophe-du-Ligneron, near Challans, but ran out of supplies and was decisively attacked by the troops of Nicolas Haxo. Trapped in the Isle of Bouin, Charette, with the fellow leader  was informed of an escape route by a local to the isle. Leaving behind all guns, ammunition, horses, refugees and the wounded, Charette, Couëtus and their men swam through the marshes to Châteauneuf.

After this, Charette's army returned and collected reinforcements; Revolutionary brutality and the 'infernal columns' sent by the Convention to destroy the Vendée forced many peasants to join Charette's army merely for safety. Charette won a victory at Saint-Fulgent, only to be chased into hiding in the forest of Grala. He emerged from it to attack Les Brouzils; he was wounded in the arm but kept on until the end of the fight. After obtaining food for his starving army, Charette was brought to La Morière, a convent near Machecoul, to recover from his wound; he was only able to rest there for a few days when his location was betrayed and the Republicans surrounded the convent. Warned, he was able to escape, but the nuns and a large number of the refugees who had come with Charette's army and had hidden in the church were massacred.

Defeat

On 17 February 1795, after being introduced to it by his sister, Charette signed the Treaty of La Jaunaye with the emissaries of the National Convention, which included freedom of religion guarantees and excluded the conscription of local peasants from the levée en masse. The republicans soon reneged on the terms of the treaty, and their parole, repudiating the guarantees of religious freedom; and they began conscripting peasants once again. They also murdered thousands of royalist prisoners including the Bishop of Dol, . Charette and his men returned to the fight again in July and moved to help the planned invasion at Quiberon by French royalist émigrés with assistance from the British Royal Navy.

The Count of Artois, the Bourbon successor to the throne of France, made him Lieutenant General and gave orders to prepare for a royal return which, however, did not eventuate. Charette remained loyal to the old dynasty and the Catholic religion, as did his men and most of the Vendean and Breton peasantry. He, and all the loyal royalists, later refused to join the liberal Orléanists. After the failure of the Quiberon expedition, Charette and his men were pursued by General Lazare Hoche. Charette was wounded but escaped. However, due to lack of munitions he was eventually captured outside  and taken to Nantes for a trial. He was sentenced to death by a republican court and then taken to the town square in procession for a public execution by firing squad. A plaque has been erected and still stands upon the place where he was shot. Today, memorial ceremonies continue to take place there.

According to a contemporary writing in Walker's Hibernian Magazine, it was Charette who said, by way of extenuating the number of deaths for which he was responsible, "Omelets are not made without breaking eggs."

Charette was described by Napoleon as a great character and military leader who "shows genius".

Depictions in films and popular culture

Charette is a character in the episode "The Frogs and the Lobsters" of the Hornblower film/television series, played by John Shrapnel.  Charette is a royalist general in exile who, with the support of the British Royal Navy, attempts and fails to rally the surviving royalists and raise an army in France to restore the king to power. Unlike his real-life counterpart, he shown as slain in battle defending a captured fortification and is also fluent in English in the television adaptation. He also dies roughly two years later than in history.

Charette has been since 2018 the lead character and his life story is depicted in the production of Le Dernier Panache ("The Last Plume"), at the French theme park Puy du Fou.

References

Sources
 Anne Bernet, Charette, Perrin, 2005
 
 Michel de Saint-Pierre, Monsieur de Charette, La Table Ronde, 1977
 George J. Hill, The Story of the War in La Vendée and the Little Chouannerie (New York: D. & J. Sadlier & Co. n.d.)

External links
The Capture and Death of the Indomitable Charette

See Also 

 Henri-Charles de Beaumanoir of Lavardin

1763 births
1796 deaths
People from Loire-Atlantique
French Navy officers
French untitled nobility
French counter-revolutionaries
French people of the American Revolution
Royalist military leaders of the War in the Vendée
French Roman Catholics
People executed by the French First Republic
Executed French people
People executed by France by firing squad
Executed people from Pays de la Loire
 Cent
People executed during the French Revolution